Tamga hamulifera is a disk-shaped fossil from Precambrian strata of the White Sea area, in Russia, the only member of the genus Tamga.

Description
The small (3–5 mm in length), disk-shaped fossil has seven hook-like isomers in a star-like arrangement in the clearly expressed peripheral undivided zone. T. hamulifera is probably a member of Proarticulata, as it is strongly similar to Praecambridium sigillum in the general shape, and the presence of hooklike isomers; Tamga is also similar to Onega stepanovi in the flattened body with a compact group of ledges-isomers in the central part encircled by an undivided zone.
The fossils of Tamga could possibly be sclerites, for example, as sclerites of palaeoscolecids show a similar shape, a disk with a ring or rows of tubercles in the center. But the size of Tamga fossils is two orders of magnitude smaller than those of palaeoscolecid sclerites, and no mineralized sclerites of any sort have ever been found or diagnosed in the Vendian–Ediacaran communities.

Etymology
The generic name is taken from the Turkish word, "tamga", meaning seal or cattle brand.  The specific name is a crasis compound word, taken from Latin, of hamulus (small hook), and the feminine form of feros, "to bear."  Thus, the scientific name can be translated as a "seal that bears small hooks."

See also
Lossinia
List of Ediacaran genera

References

White Sea fossils
Proarticulata incertae sedis
Fossil taxa described in 2007
Ediacaran Europe